The 2019 FIBA Europe Cup Finals were the concluding games of the 2018–19 FIBA Europe Cup season. The Finals will be played in a two-legged format, with the first leg being played on April 24 and the second one on 1 May 2019.  The finals were played between Dinamo Sassari and s.Oliver Würzburg. Both teams appeared in their first FIBA Europe Cup final, as well as their first European final.

Dinamo won its first European championship after defeating Würzburg in both legs.

Venue

Road to the Finals

Note: In the table, the score of the finalist is given first (H = home; A = away).

First leg

Second leg

References

See also

2019 EuroLeague Final Four
2019 EuroCup Finals
2019 Basketball Champions League Final Four

2019
2018–19 FIBA Europe Cup
FIBA Europe Cup Finals
2018–19 in Italian basketball
2018–19 in German basketball
Sassari
Würzburg
International basketball competitions hosted by Italy
International basketball competitions hosted by Germany